Oak Hall is a census-designated place in Accomack County, Virginia. It was first listed as a CDP on March 31, 2010. Per the 2020 census, the population was 226.

Geography
It lies at an elevation of 26 feet.

Demographics

2020 census

Note: the US Census treats Hispanic/Latino as an ethnic category. This table excludes Latinos from the racial categories and assigns them to a separate category. Hispanics/Latinos can be of any race.

References

Census-designated places in Accomack County, Virginia
Census-designated places in Virginia